The list of ship launches in 1712 includes a chronological list of some ships launched in 1712.


References

1712
Ship launches